Sami Damian (sometimes referred to as S. Damian or Samy Damian (born Samuel Druckmann, 18 July 1930, Alba Iulia, Romania -  1 August 2012) was a Romanian-born Jewish literary critic and essayist.

Biography

Studies 
S. Damian studied at the Jewish "Cultura Max Aziel" middle school in Bucharest, then at the "Mihai Eminescu" Literature and Literary Criticism School in Bucharest (1950-1955), and at the Faculty of Letters of the University of Bucharest (diploma received in  1972).

Literary activity 
S. Damian made his debut around 1955/1956 with literary criticism written in the spirit of that age's dogmatism.

He worked for a while as a copy editor for Contemporanul, Gazeta literară, România literară and Luceafărul.

Marginalised for a period of time, he was sent to West Germany in the mid-1970s to teach Romanian language and literature at the University of Heidelberg, after which he defected. He would continue to teach there until 1995.

After the Romanian Revolution of 1989, he published several books of literary criticism, essays, etc.

He married Simona Timaru-Druckmann in 1996.

In 1998 Ion Negoițescu's book Dialoguri după tăcere. Scrisori către S. Damian ("Dialogues after silence. Letters to S. Damian") was published.

He had a twin brother, Marcel.

Books 
 Generalitatea și individualitatea ideii operei literare (The Generality and Individuality of the Idea of Literary Work), 1955
 Încercări de analiză literară (Attempts at Literary Analysis), 1956
 Direcții și tendințe în proza nouă (Directions and Tendencies in the New Prose), 1963
 Intrarea în castel (Entering the Castle), București, 1970
 G. Călinescu romancier. Eseu despre măștile jocului (G. Calinescu, Novelist. An Essay on the Game Masks), 1971
 Scufița Roșie nu mai merge în pădure (Litte Red Riding Hood Does Not Go Into the Woods Anymore), 1994
 Fals tratat despre psihologia succesului (False Treatise on the Psychology of Success), 1972; ediția București, 1995
 Duelul invizibil (The Invisible Duel), 1996 
 Replici din burta lupului (Replies From the Wolf's Belly), București, 1997
 Aruncând mănușa (Throwing the Gauntlet), București, 1999
 Pivnițe, mansarde, nu puține trepte (Basements, Attics, Not Few Stairs), 2002
 Aripile lui Icar (The Wings of Icarus), 2004
 Trepte în sus, trepte în jos (Stairs Up, Stairs Down), 2006
 Păr de aur, păr de cenușă (Hair of Gold, Hair of Ashes), 2007
 Nu toți copacii s-au înălțat la cer (Not All the Trees Have Grown to the Sky), 2010
 Zbor aproape de pământ (Flying Close to the Ground), 2008

Awards 
 Romanian Writers' Union Award, 1970

References 

 Article in România literară by Gelu Ionescu  
 Article in România literară about Pivnițe, mansarde, nu puține trepte  
 Obituary  

1930 births
2012 deaths
People from Alba Iulia
Romanian essayists
Romanian literary critics
Jewish Romanian writers
Romanian expatriates in Germany
Romanian defectors